Zu Ding, personal name Zi Xin, was a king of the Chinese Shang dynasty.

Records
In the Records of the Grand Historian he was listed by Sima Qian as the sixteenth Shang king, succeeding his uncle Wo Jia. He was enthroned in the year of Dingwei with Bi as his capital. He ruled for about 32 years before his death. He was given the posthumous name Zu Ding and was succeeded by his cousin Nan Geng.

Oracle script inscriptions on oracle bones unearthed at Yinxu alternatively record that he was the fifteenth Shang king.

Attempts at chronological dating
The Xia–Shang–Zhou Chronology Project, a broad Chinese academic enquiry, published results in 2000 placing Zu Ding as a contemporary of the Egyptian pharaoh Akhenaten — the latter's reign beginning later than Zu Ding's, but both terminating in the mid-1330s BCE.

References

Shang dynasty kings